"Ol' Country" is a song written by Bobby Harden and recorded by American country music singer Mark Chesnutt.  It was released in January 1993 as the fourth and final single from his album: Longnecks & Short Stories.  It peaked at number 4 on the U.S. Billboard Hot Country Singles & Tracks chart and at number 2 on the Canadian RPM Country Tracks chart.

Content
The song tells the story of a country boy from Birmingham, Alabama and a city girl from Ohio who met each other by chance and fell in love.

Music video
The music video was directed by John Lloyd Miller and premiered in early 1993.

Chart performance

Year-end charts

References

1993 singles
Mark Chesnutt songs
MCA Records singles
Song recordings produced by Mark Wright (record producer)
Music videos directed by John Lloyd Miller
1992 songs
Songs written by Bobby Harden